

Events
August 23 – Maria Anna Mozart marries Johann Baptist Franz von Berchtold.
September 24 – The Bolshoi Kamenny Theatre in Saint Petersburg, Russia, opens with a performance of Giovanni Paisiello’s opera Il mondo della luna.
John Broadwood patents a piano pedal in England.

Classical music
Johann Adolph Hasse - Missa Ultima in g minor
Carl Friedrich Abel – 6 Symphonies, Op. 17
Johann Georg Albrechtsberger – Mass in D major
Carl Philipp Emanuel Bach – 2 Sonaten, 2 Fantasien und 3 Rondos für Kenner und Liebhaber, Wq.58
Ludwig van Beethoven – Three Piano Sonatas, WoO 47 ("Kurfuerstensonaten") in E-flat, F, and D
Muzio Clementi 
3 Piano Sonatas, Op.9
3 Piano Sonatas, Op.10
Carl Ditters von Dittersdorf – Six Symphonies after Ovid's Metamorphoses
Jane Mary Guest – 6 Sonatas, Op. 1
Joseph Haydn
Baryton Trio Hob. XI:101, 103, and 108
Cello Concerto in D
Michael Haydn – Symphony in E-flat major
Anton Kraft – 3 Cello Sonatas, Op. 2
Joseph Martin Kraus – String Quartets, Op.1 (published, Berlin: J.J. Hummel, Plate 561) 
Wolfgang Amadeus Mozart
Luci care, luci belle, K.346/439a
Mia speranza adorata, K.416
Vorrei spiegarvi, o Dio, K.418
Duo for Violin and Viola, K.423
Duo for Violin and Viola, K.424
Symphony No. 36 in C major, K. 425
Great Mass in C minor, K. 427
Così dunque tradisci, K.432/421a
Ecco quel fiero istante, K.436
Mi lagnerò tacendo, K.437
Due pupille amabili, K.439
Country Dance in G major, K.610
Giovanni Paisiello – La passione di Gesù Cristo
Antonio Rosetti – Sextet in D major, M.B24/II:19
Daniel Gottlob Türk – 12 Leichte Klaviersonaten
Giovanni Battista Viotti 
Concerto for Piano No. 7 in G
Violin Concerto No.10 in B-flat major
Samuel Wesley – Magnificat

Opera
Felice Alessandri – Artaserse
Pasquale Anfossi – La finta ammalata
Domenico Cimarosa 
I due baroni di Rocca Azzurra
Oreste
La villana riconosciuta
Vincenzo Fabrizi – I tre gobbi rivali
André Grétry – La Caravane du Caire
Niccolò Piccinni – Didon
Antonio Sacchini – Renaud
William Shield – The Poor Soldier

Published popular music
"I had a horse, I had nae mair", "The Rigs o' Barley", and other songs by Robert Burns

Methods and theory writings 

 Anton Bemetzrieder 
 Abstract of the Talents and Knowledge of a Musician
 New Lessons for the Harpsichord
 Johann Michael Weissbeck – Protestationschrift oder Exemplarische Widerlegung
 Georg Friedrich Wolf – Kurzer aber deutlicher Unterricht im Klavierspielen

Births
January 12 – Erik Gustaf Geijer, writer and composer (d. 1847)
January 20 – Justus Johann Friedrich Dotzauer, German cellist and composer (d. 1860)
January 26 – Helmina von Chézy, librettist (d. 1856)
February 9 – Vasily Zhukovsky, librettist and poet (died 1852)
February 15 – Johann Nepomuk Poissl, composer
March 8 – Gottfied Wilhelm Fink, German composer (died 1846)
March 26 – Johann Baptist Weigl, composer
April 21 – Reginald Heber, librettist and clergyman (died 1826)
May 10 – Niccola Benvenuti, composer
May 14 – Jacques Jules Bouffil, composer and musician (died 1868)
May 22 – Thomas Forbes Walmisley, composer (died 1866)
June 29 – August Alexander Klengel, pianist, organist and composer
September 23 – Jane Taylor, librettist and poet (died 1824)
October 13 – Frantiszek Soltyk, composer
December 14 – Johann Christoph Kienlen, composer
December 28 – Wenzel Robert von Gallenberg, composer
date unknown – Charles-François-Jean-Baptiste Moreau, French librettist (died 1832)

Deaths
January 5 – Friedrich Wilhelm Riedt, flautist, music theorist and composer (born 1710)
January 10 – Phanuel Bacon, librettist and writer (born 1700)
January 14 – Giacobbe Cervetto, cellist and composer (born 1682)
January 31 – Caffarelli, castrato singer (born 1710)
February 10 – James Nares, composer (born 1715)
February 21 – Richard Duke, violin maker (born 1718)
March 1 – Thomas Lowe, tenor (born c.1719)
March 23 – Gaspard Fritz, composer
April 7 – Ignaz Holzbauer, composer (born 1711)
May 11 – Juliane Reichardt, composer and pianist (born 1752)
May 18 – Lucrezia Aguiari, coloratura soprano (born 1741)
July 27 – Johann Kirnberger, music theorist/violist (born 1721)
October 7 – William Tans'ur, composer, teacher and arranger of hymn tunes (born c.1706)
October 29 – Jean le Rond d'Alembert, music theorist and philosopher (born 1717)
November 3 – Charles Collé, songwriter (born 1709)
December 16 – Johann Adolph Hasse, singer, composer and music teacher (born 1699)
December 20 – Antonio Soler, composer (born 1729)

References

 
18th century in music
Music by year